

Imperial College Computing Engines

ICCE I and ICCE II were digital computers built at the Imperial College Department of Mathematics in the post-war period.

ICCE I 

The first Imperial College Computing Engine, ICCE I, was constructed by Sidney Michaelson, Tony Brooker and Keith Tocher in the Department of Mathematics at Imperial College London in the late 1940's and early 1950's. It was a relay based machine which gave relatively slow but highly reliable service. Its current whereabouts is unknown.

ICCE II 

ICCE II was constructed by Sidney Michaelson, Keith Tocher and Manny Lehman in the early 1950's. This valve based machine was never completed. ICCE II was taken by Keith Tocher to British Steel. Its current whereabouts is unknown.

Influence on other machines 

ICCE I and II influenced the design of SABRAC, the second computer constructed in Israel by The Israeli MoD Scientific Department.

Project Termination 

In 1956/7, the project was forcibly terminated. Staff dispersed. in 1951 Tony Brooker had left to join the Computing Machine Laboratory at the Universtity of Manchester. Keith Tocher took ICCE II and went to work at British Steel, Sidney Michaelson went to the University of Edinburgh and founded the Computer Unit which subsequently became the Department of Computer Science, now the school of informatics. Manny Lehman ultimately joined the Israeli MoD Scientific Department which subsequently became Rafael.

See Also 
 Wilks MV and Stringer LJB, Micro-Programming and the Design of the Control Circuits in an Electronic Computer, Proc. Camb. Phil. Soc., vol 49, no. 2, 1953
 Tocher KD, Classification and Design of Operation Codes for Automatic Computers, Proc. IEE, 103B, Supplement 1, Apr. 1956
 Tocher KD and Lehman MM, A Fast Parallel Arithmetic Unit, Proc. IEE 103B, Supplement 3, Apr. 1956, pp. 520 - 527
 Lehman MM, Parallel Arithmetic Units and Their Control, PhD Thesis, University of London, Feb. 1957, 160pps.+
 Lehman MM, Short-Cut Multiplication and Division in Automatic Binary Digital Computers with Special Reference to a New Multiplication Process, Proc. IEE, vol 105, Part B, No 23, Sept 1958 , pps. 496 - 504
 Tocher KD, Techniques of Multiplication and Division for Automatic Binary Computers, Quart. J. of Mechanics and Appl. Maths., v. 11, p. 3, 1958, pps. 364 - 384
 http://www.macs.hw.ac.uk/~greg/icce/

References

British
Computers designed in the United Kingdom
History of computing in the United Kingdom